The 1979 Australian Championship of Makes was a CAMS sanctioned Australian motor racing title open to Group C Touring Cars. It was the ninth manufacturers’ title to be awarded by CAMS and the fourth to carry the Australian Championship of Makes name. The title was awarded to Holden.

Calendar
The 1979 Australian Championship of Makes was contested over a three-round series with one race per round.

A fourth round, scheduled to be held at Oran Park on 18 November, was cancelled.

Classes
Cars competed in three classes:
Up to 2000cc
2001 to 3000cc
3001 to 6000cc

Points system
Championship points were awarded on a 9-6-4-3-2-1 basis to the best six placed cars in each class. Only the highest placed car of each make was awarded points and then only the points applicable to the position filled.
The title was awarded to the make of car gaining the highest number of points in the series with all points acquired in all races counted. No drivers' title was allocated or permitted to be advertised in connection with the title.

Results

Holden Torana and Toyota Celica both achieved maximum points, each winning its class at each of the three rounds. The title was awarded to the former on the grounds that it also featured in the minor placings.

The cars
The following models contributed to the championship pointscores.
Holden LX Torana SS A9X & Holden LX Torana SLR 5000 A9X
Toyota Celica RA40
Mazda RX-3
Ford XC Falcon
Alfa Romeo GTV & Alfa Romeo Alfetta GTV
BMW 3.0
Volkswagen Golf

It would appear that placings gained by other models from the same manufacturer were not considered in determining championship placings. The first place gained by Ford Capri in the 2001 to 3000cc class at the Surfers Paradise round is an example of this.

Notes & references

Championship of Makes
Australian Manufacturers' Championship
Australian Championship of Makes